A Very Merry Christmas is Bobby Vinton's ninth studio album and first Christmas album, released in October 1964. Vinton had released a four-track Christmas EP which entered the charts the previous year, containing none of the tracks included on A Very Merry Christmas. Due to Billboard editorial policy, it was held off the regular Top LPs chart, but reached #13 on the Christmas Albums chart. The album was reissued on CD in 1995, and again in 2015 as the expanded A Very Merry Christmas: The Complete Epic Christmas Collection.

There were two singles to come from this album: "The Bell That Couldn't Jingle" and "Dearest Santa".

Track listing

Personnel
Robert Morgan - producer
Stan Applebaum - arranger, conductor
Ray Ellis - arranger, conductor
Hugo Winterhalter - arranger, conductor

Charts
Album – Billboard (North America)

Singles – Billboard (North America)

References

1964 Christmas albums
Bobby Vinton albums
Christmas albums by American artists
Epic Records albums
Albums arranged by Ray Ellis
Albums arranged by Hugo Winterhalter
Albums conducted by Ray Ellis
Albums conducted by Hugo Winterhalter
Pop Christmas albums